Edward McKeever Rands (June 2, 1856 – April 13, 1922) was an American politician in the state of Washington. He served in the Washington State Senate from 1901 to 1909 (1901 to 1903 for district 13, 1903 to 1909 for district 17).

References

Republican Party Washington (state) state senators
1856 births
1922 deaths
People from Marshalltown, Iowa